Noriega is one of three parishes (administrative divisions) in Ribadedeva, a municipality within the province and autonomous community of Asturias, in northern Spain.

The population is 313 (INE 2011).

Villages
 Bojes
 Boquerizo
 Noriega

References

Parishes in Ribadedeva